Erythronium mesochoreum, the prairie fawn lily or midland fawnlily, is a plant species in the lily family, native to the US states of Illinois, Iowa, Indiana, Nebraska, Kansas, Missouri, Oklahoma, Texas and Arkansas.

Erythronium mesochoreum forms round to egg-shaped bulbs up to 25 mm long. Leaves are elliptic to lanceolate, up to 14 cm long. Scape is up to 15 cm tall, bearing only one flower. Tepals are spreading at flowering time, white with blue or purple tinge on the underside and a yellow spot on the upper side. Anthers are yellow, and style is white.

References

mesochoreum
Flora of the United States
Plants described in 1891